The 2011 Season of the Supertaça Compal (2nd edition), took place in Lisbon, Portugal from February 11 to 13, 2011, in Portugal and was contested by four teams in a single round robin system. Primeiro de Agosto of Angola was the winner and Felizardo Ambrósio from Primeiro de Agosto, the tournament's MVP.

2011 Supertaça Compal participants

2011 Supertaça Compal squads

 1º de Agosto vs.  R. do Libolo

 FC Porto vs.  Benfica

 1º de Agosto vs.  Benfica

 R. do Libolo vs.  FC Porto

 R. do Libolo vs.  Benfica

 1º de Agosto vs.  FC Porto

Final standings

Awards

2011 Supertaça Compal MVP
  Felizardo Ambrósio (Primeiro de Agosto)

2011 Supertaça Compal Top Scorer
 

2011 Supertaça Compal Top Rebounder
 

2011 Supertaça Compal Top Assists

See also
COMPAL
Federação Angolana de Basquetebol
Federação Portuguesa de Basquetebol

References

External links
Interbasket Forum Page

Supertaça Compal seasons
International basketball competitions hosted by Portugal
2010–11 in Angolan basketball
2010–11 in Portuguese basketball